Frederick Hodgson(1795–1854) was an English  politician who represented Barnstaple from 1824 to 1830; 1831 to 1832; and 1837 to 1847.

References

http://www.historyofparliamentonline.org/volume/1820-1832/member/hodgson-frederick-1795-1854

1795 births
1854 deaths
Members of the Parliament of the United Kingdom for Barnstaple
UK MPs 1820–1826
UK MPs 1826–1830
UK MPs 1831–1832
UK MPs 1837–1841
UK MPs 1841–1847